Events in the year 2021 in Costa Rica.

Incumbents 

 President: Carlos Alvarado Quesada
 First Vice President: Epsy Campbell Barr
 Second Vice President: Marvin Rodríguez Cordero

Events 
Ongoing – COVID-19 pandemic in Costa Rica
January 30 – Tourism Minister Gustavo Segura predicts about one million tourists will visit Costa Rica in 2021, on par with the 1,011,000 in 2020 but sharply down from the 3,139,000 international visitors of 2019.
February 8 – Students return to live classes after suspension for the COVID-19 pandemic.
March 28–April 3 — Holy Week
April 11 – Juan Santamaría Day, 165th anniversary of the hero′s death.
July 26 – Guanacaste Day, 197th anniversary of the annexation of Guanacaste Province.
August 15 – Mother's Day and Assumption of Mary.
September 20 – Independence Day, 206th anniversary of the Act of Independence of Central America.
December 1 – Army Abolition Day, since 1948.

Sports
August 24 to September 5 – Costa Rica at the 2020 Summer Paralympics
2020–21 Liga FPD

Deaths
March 20 – Bernal Jiménez Monge, 91, politician, president of the Legislative Assembly (1984–1985), MP (1982–1986, 2002–2006) and minister of economy and finance (1964–1965).

See also
2021 Atlantic hurricane season
COVID-19 pandemic in North America

References

External links
Costa Rica’s ‘explosive’ debt crisis: All you need to know (by Sandra Cuffe, Al Jazeera, January 16, 2021)

 
2020s in Costa Rica
Years of the 21st century in Costa Rica
Costa Rica
Costa Rican